The 1896–97 FA Cup was the 26th season of the world's oldest association football competition, the Football Association Challenge Cup (more usually known as the FA Cup). The cup was won by Aston Villa, who defeated Everton 3–2 in the final of the competition, played at Crystal Palace in London. In doing so, Aston Villa became only the second team to have won the Double, as they won the league on the same day as their cup victory (and the only team to do this).

Matches were scheduled to be played at the stadium of the team named first on the date specified for each round, which was always a Saturday. If scores were level after 90 minutes had been played, a replay would take place at the stadium of the second-named team later the same week. If the replayed match was drawn further replays would be held at neutral venues until a winner was determined. If scores were level after 90 minutes had been played in a replay, a 30-minute period of extra time would be played.

Calendar
The format of the FA Cup for the season had a preliminary round, five qualifying rounds, three proper rounds, and the semi finals and final. Each of the Rounds Proper were played on a set date, whereas the Preliminary and Qualifying Round matches were played on several dates over a given period of time.

First round proper
The first round proper contained 16 ties between 32 teams. The 16 First Division sides were given a bye to this round, as were Notts County, Small Heath, Burton Wanderers, Grimsby Town, Newcastle United and Manchester City from the Second Division. The other Second Division sides were entered into the third qualifying round. Of those sides, only Newton Heath and Burton Swifts qualified to the FA Cup proper. Eight non-league sides also qualified.

The matches were played on Saturday, 30 January 1897. One match was drawn, with the replay taking place in the following midweek fixture.

Second round proper
The eight Second Round matches were scheduled for Saturday, 13 February 1897. There was one replay, played in the following midweek fixture.

Third round proper
The four Third Round matches were scheduled for Saturday, 27 February 1897. There were two replays, played in the following midweek fixture, of which the Preston North End – Aston Villa match went to a second replay the following week.

Semi-finals
The semi-final matches were both played on Saturday, 20 March 1897. Aston Villa and Everton went on to meet in the final at Crystal Palace.

Final

The final took place on Saturday, 10 April 1897 at Crystal Palace.  Just under 66,000 supporters attended the match. John Campbell opened the scoring for Villa after 18 minutes. Villa's lead was maintained for only five minutes before Everton equalised, through a goal from Jack Bell. Everton then went in front after Dickie Boyle scored five minutes later, but that lead only lasted seven minutes, when Fred Wheldon got an equaliser. Jimmy Crabtree put Villa back in front just before half-time, and Villa managed to come through the second half without conceding, meaning they had become only the second team ever to win the Double in England.

Match details

See also
FA Cup Final Results 1872-

References
General
Official site; fixtures and results service at TheFA.com
1896-1897 FA Cup at rsssf.com
1896-1897 FA Cup at soccerbase.com

Specific

1896-97
1896–97 in English football
FA